William or Bill Jeffrey may refer to:
 Bill Jeffrey (born 1948), British civil servant
 William A. Jeffrey, American scientist
 William Jeffrey (cricketer) (1950–1993), Guyanese cricket player and coach
 William Jeffrey (footballer) (1866–1932), English footballer with Burnley, Arsenal and Southampton
 William Jeffrey (American soccer) (1892–1966), head coach of the 1950 United States World Cup team
 William Jeffrey (Tsimshian chief) (born 1899), hereditary Tsimshian Chief, First Nations activist and carver
 William Jeffrey, a pseudonym of writer Bill Pronzini